The Eighth Kerala Legislative Assembly Council of Ministers, second E. K. Nayanar ministry, was a Kerala Council of Ministers (Kerala Cabinet), the executive wing of Kerala state government, led by Communist Party leader E. K. Nayanar from 26 March 1987 to 17 June 1991. It consisted of nineteen ministries, and overall twenty ministers.

The Kerala Council of Ministers, during Nayanar's second term as Chief Minister of Kerala, consisted of:

Ministers

See also 
 List of chief ministers of Kerala
 Kerala Council of Ministers

Notes

Nayanar 02
Communist Party of India (Marxist) state ministries
1987 establishments in Kerala
1991 disestablishments in India
Cabinets established in 1987
Cabinets disestablished in 1991